The following List of Activision games: 1980–1999 is a portion of the List of Activision video games.

References

External links
List of Activision games from MobyGames

Activision